Gabriel Maria Roschini, OSM (December 19, 1900 – September 12, 1977), was a Roman Catholic Italian priest and professor of Mariology, who published over 900 titles on the subject. During the pontificate of Pope Pius XII, he worked closely with the Vatican  on Marian publications. In light of the encyclopedic accuracy of his work, Roschini is considered one of the top two  Mariologists of the 20th century. His first major work, a four volume Mariology, Il Capolavoro di Dio, is judged to be the most comprehensive mariological presentation in the 20th century. Several theologians called him "one of the most profound mariologists" and "irreplaceable".

Life and contributions
Roschini was born in Castel Sant'Elia (Viterbo, Italy) in 1900. Upon entering Servites, he changed his name to Gabriel Maria (or Gabriele Maria) from his given name of Alessandro. In 1924, he received his ordination as a priest. Additionally, Roschini was a doctor in philosophy and a master in sacred theology. He founded the journal Marianum in 1939 and directed it for thirty years. In 1950 during the reign of Pope Pius XII he founded the Marianum Theological Faculty, which is now a pontifical institute, and served as its rector. He was also instrumental in reviving the Marian Library, which was transferred to the International College of Saint Alexis Falconieri in 1946. Other roles included professor at the Lateran Pontifical University and the Marianum Pontifical Theology Faculty, as well as advisor for the Congregation for the Doctrine of the Faith and the Sacred Congregation for the Causes of the Saints. His death in Rome in 1977 corresponded to the Feast of the Holy Name of Mary, on September 12.

Impact on Mariology
During the pontificate of Pius XII, “the most Marian Pope in Church history”. Roschini worked closely with the Pontiff, arranging his own publications parallel to Papal mariological promulgations. During and after Vatican II, Roschini tried to adjust to the colder mariological spirit in his  1973 publication  Il mistero di Maria considerato alla luce del mistero di Cristo  e della Chiesa,  an updated  four volume handbook of mariology. This largely explains the animosity of Dominican theologian Yves-Marie Congar, strongly opposed to such perceived mariological excesses; indeed, in his journal, Congar once called the eminent Mariologist "Trouduc Roschini" ("Asshole Roschini").

Altogether he published over 900 titles, mostly on Mariology, in addition to his encyclopedic works, reviewing the mariological contributions of saints like Bernard of Clairvaux and Anthony of Padua. In 1950 he explained the mariology of Saint Thomas Aquinas. He detailed his mariology in a major work in the year 1952.

Earlier, Roschini had contributed with a new interpretation  to the Mariological theology of the Co-redemptrix, which was not universally accepted. In his 1946 publication Compendium Mariologiae  he explained that Mary not only participated physically in the life of Jesus by giving birth  to him but also, when she conceived her divine Son, she entered into a spiritual union with him. The divine salvation plan, being not only material, includes permanent spiritual unity with Christ. Most mariologists agree with this position. Roschini entered new theological territory, when he defined the spiritual unity of Mary and Christ to form  a "salvation pair", in which Mary is a true helper of her son. However, in this salvation duo, Mary is clearly subordinated to her son, according to Roschini, who, not wanting of course to elevate Mary to the level of divinity, insisted that Mary needed salvation through Christ like all other people. But, because she is the mother of God, the only mother of God among all women, Mary is someone unique. Sharing with all other people their human nature, she is different. She belongs to Christ, with whom she is spiritually united.
 Marian views of Roschini have continued to gather interest and are subject to continued research, with doctoral theses in theology and books written about him.

Views on Maria Valtorta
Internet citations most often invoke Roschini as a supporter of Maria Valtorta’s somewhat controversial book, The Poem of the Man God. Roschini's book, The Virgin Mary in the Writings of Maria Valtorta, provides an exegesis of the favorable representation of Mary in the Poem. At first, Roschini was skeptical of The Poem of the Man God’s authenticity but upon studying the work grew to appreciate it as a private revelation, concluding: “We find ourselves facing an effect (her work) which seems to be beyond its cause (Maria Valtorta)” (p. 7). He wrote of Valtorta:

"I must candidly admit that the Mariology found in Maria Valtorta's writings, whether published or not, has been for me a real discovery. No other Marian writing, not even the sum total of all the writings I have read and studied were able to give me as clear, as lively, as complete, as luminous, or as fascinating an image, both simple and sublime, of Mary, God's masterpiece."

Roschini presided over the services of Valtorta’s “privileged burial,” in which her remains were relocated from Viareggio to the Santissima Annunziata Basilica in Florence in 1973.

Selected publications

 Il Capolavoro di Dio, Mariology in IV volumes, Roma 1933
 Compendium Mariologiae, Roma, 1946
 La Mariologia di Sant'Antonio da Padova, in Marianum, Roma, 1946
 La Madonna secondo la fede e la Teologia, Roma, 1950
 La Mariologia di San Tommaso, Roma, 1950
 Mariologia, Roma, 1952
 La Madonna secondo la fede e la teologia  IV volumes, Roma  1953 1954
 Il dottore Mariano, Studio sulla dottrina di San Bernardo di Chiaravalle, Roma 1953
 The Virgin Mary in the Writings of Maria Valtorta, Kolbe's Publications 
 Dizionario di Mariologia, Roma, 1957
 Il misteri di Maria considerato alla luce del mistero di Cristo  e della Chiesa, Roma  1973

See also

References

Sources and external links
 Pietro Parrotta, The Role of the Virgin Mary in Redemption in the Writings of Gabriele Maria Roschini , Varese, Italy: Eupress-FTL, 2002, 
 Remigius Bäumer, Gabriel Roschini, in Marienlexikon, St. Ottilien, 1994
 Publisher's Notice in the Second Italian Edition (1986), reprinted in English Edition, Gabriel Roschini, O.S.M. (1989). The Virgin Mary in the Writings of Maria Valtorta (English Edition). Kolbe's Publication Inc. 

1900 births
1977 deaths
20th-century Italian Roman Catholic theologians
Catholic Mariology
Servites
20th-century Italian Roman Catholic priests